Adoption by LGBT people in Europe differs in legal recognition from country to country. Full joint adoption or step-child adoption or both is legal in 22 of the 56 European countries, and in all dependent territories.

Full joint adoption by same-sex couples is legal in nineteen European countries, namely Andorra, Austria, Belgium, Croatia, Denmark, Finland, France, Germany, Iceland, Ireland, Liechtenstein, Luxembourg, Malta, the Netherlands, Norway, Portugal, Slovenia, Spain, Sweden, Switzerland, and the United Kingdom. Two countries, namely Estonia and  San Marino, permit step-child adoption in which the registered partner can adopt the biological and, in some cases, the adopted child of his or her partner. In Greece, same-sex couples in a civil partnership may become foster – but not adoptive – parents.

In dependent territories, joint adoption by same-sex couples is legal in Saint Helena, Ascension and Tristan da Cunha, Cayman Islands, Gibraltar, Falkland Islands, Guernsey, Greenland, the Faroe Islands, the Isle of Man and Jersey. Several countries are currently considering permitting full joint or step-child adoption by same-sex couples.

Current situation

Joint adoption

Step-child adoption 

In Italy step-child adoption is not legal and can only be recognized by court order under very limited circumstances.

Other

Public opinion 

According to pollster Gallup Europe, women, younger generations, and the highly educated are more likely to support same-sex marriage and adoption rights for gay people than other demographics.

See also 

 LGBT rights in Europe
 LGBT rights in the European Union
 LGBT adoption
 LGBT parenting
 Adoption
 Recognition of same-sex unions in Europe

References